The Malta Maritime Museum is a maritime museum in Birgu, Malta. It is housed in the former Royal Naval Bakery, which was built in the 1840s as the main bakery for the Mediterranean Fleet. The museum has a collection of over 20,000 artifacts, and it is the largest museum on the island.

The museum's aim is to illustrate Malta's maritime history, starting from prehistory to the present. The museum shows this within a Mediterranean and a global context.

History

The first plans to establish the Malta Maritime Museum were made in 1988, when an advisory committee was set up to set up the museum and collect artifacts from a number of sources. The then-derelict former Royal Naval Bakery in Birgu was chosen to house the museum.

After four years, the museum opened to the public on 24 July 1992. It was inaugurated by the Minister for Education and Museums, Ugo Mifsud Bonnici. Since its establishment, the museum's collections have increased by donations from Maltese and foreign individuals, foreign maritime museums, foreign navies, and several companies and corporate bodies.

The building

The museum is housed in a large building on the Birgu waterfront which was formerly the Royal Naval Bakery. It was constructed between 1842 and 1845 on the site of the arsenal of the navy of the Order of Saint John. It was designed by the architect William Scamp, and its façade was reportedly inspired by Windsor Castle. The bakery took over the role of the Order's bakery in Valletta.

The bakery formed part of the Victualling Yard of the Malta Dockyard, which supplied naval personnel of the Mediterranean Fleet with food and drink. At its peak, the bakery produced  of bread and biscuits every day using steam-powered machinery.

After World War II, the bakery was converted into the headquarters of the Admiralty Constabulary, also housing some offices and stores. It remained in use until British forces left Malta in 1979, and it was subsequently abandoned before reopening as the Malta Maritime Museum in 1992.

Collection

The Malta Maritime Museum's collection includes over 20,000 artifacts illustrating Malta's maritime history. The collection includes boats, models of various ships and boats, anchors, amphorae, cannons, weapons, documents, paintings, uniforms, and a 1950s steam engine. Highlights include a large model of a third-rate ship of the navy of the Order of Saint John. This particular model dates back to the mid 18th-century, and it was probably used by the Order's nautical school. Another notable artifact is the largest known Roman anchor in the world, which weighs 4 tons. The collection also includes the figurehead of the Napoleonic-era ship of the line HMS Hibernia.

The museum is open every day from 09:00 to 17:00, and it is closed on Christmas Eve, Christmas Day, New Year's Eve, New Year's Day and Good Friday.

See also
 List of museums in Malta

Further reading
The Malta Maritime Museum
Documents and Artefacts of the French Period at the Malta Maritime Museum

References

External links

Heritage Malta

Buildings and structures in Birgu
Bakeries of Malta
Industrial buildings completed in 1845
Museums established in 1992
Maritime museums
Museums in Malta
History of the Mediterranean
Sites managed by Heritage Malta
1992 establishments in Malta